The Hueneosauria are a group of Ichthyosauria, living during the Mesozoic.

In 2000, Michael Werner Maisch and Andreas Matzke defined a node clade Hueneosauria as the group consisting of the last common ancestor of Mixosaurus cornalianus and Ophthalmosaurus icenicus; and all of its descendants. The clade is named after Friedrich von Huene, a German paleontologist who was a leading ichthyosaur expert in the early twentieth century.

The Hueneosauria contain the more derived ichthyosaurs, which have the morphology of a fish. The group originated in the early Triassic and became extinct during the Cretaceous.

References

Ichthyosaurs
Triassic ichthyosaurs
Cretaceous ichthyosaurs
Early Triassic first appearances
Cretaceous extinctions